The 1837 siege of Constantine was decided by Louis Philippe I and the head of his government, Count Molé in the summer of 1837. At the time, during the consolidation of the July Monarchy and recovery economic prosperity, the king was considering dissolving of the Chamber of Deputies.

As with Charles X's 1830 expedition to Algiers, the king of France was seeking more votes in the upcoming elections by offering the country military glory and revenge for Clausel's failed expedition against Constantine in 1836.

The preparation of the expedition at the end of August was marred by a bitter rivalry between the king's eldest sons, Prince Ferdinand Philippe and Prince Louis, who both vied for the honor to participate. The eldest considered that it was his right, while the second, who participated in the unsuccessful expedition of the previous year, was keen to avenge this humiliation. Ultimately it was the younger prince who participated.

The army met in the camp Merdjez-Hammar, established on the banks of the Seybouse in Guelma Province, halfway between Bôna and Constantine. Placed under the command of the Governor-General, General Damrémont, the army was formed in four brigades. The 1st Brigade in the vanguard was commanded by the Duke of Nemours, the second, third and fourth brigades were under the command of Generals Trezel and Rulhieres. General Valée commanded the artillery and General Rohault de Fleury the engineers.

The French Army went from Bône on October 1. The siege started on October 10. On October 12, the victorious assault was begun by General Damrémont, and was, after Damrémont was killed, completed by his successor, the General Valée. The latter was raised to the rank of Marshal of France on November 11 and appointed Governor-General of the French Possessions in Africa on December 1.

See also
 French conquest of Algeria
 Charles-Marie Denys de Damrémont
 Sylvain Charles Valée
 Alexandre Charles Perrégaux

References 

The information in this article is based on that in its French equivalent.

Conflicts in 1837
Sieges involving France
Constantine, Algeria
October 1837 events
Constantine